The Three Forks springsnail, scientific name Pyrgulopsis trivialis, is a species of very small  freshwater snail with a gill and an operculum, an aquatic gastropod mollusk in the family Hydrobiidae. This species is endemic to the United States. The common name is a reference to its endemic range at Three Forks, Arizona.

References

Endemic fauna of the United States
Pyrgulopsis
Gastropods described in 1987
Taxonomy articles created by Polbot